Shakil Hossain (born 22 April 2000) is a Bangladeshi cricketer. He made his List A debut for Brothers Union in the 2017–18 Dhaka Premier Division Cricket League on 17 February 2018. Prior to his List A debut, he was part of Bangladesh's squad for the 2018 Under-19 Cricket World Cup. He made his Twenty20 debut for Abahani Limited in the 2018–19 Dhaka Premier Division Twenty20 Cricket League on 25 February 2019. He made his first-class debut for Dhaka Division in the 2019–20 National Cricket League on 10 October 2019.

References

External links
 

2000 births
Living people
Bangladeshi cricketers
Abahani Limited cricketers
Brothers Union cricketers
Dhaka Division cricketers
Place of birth missing (living people)